Md. Shahjahan Ali Talukder (1954/1955 – 28 June 2020) was a Bangladeshi politician and a Jatiya Sangsad member representing the Bogra-5 constituency winning the 1988 Bangladeshi general election.

Career 
Talukder was a lawyer. He was a president of Bogra District Jatiya Party and a member of the Central Committee of the party.

Talukder died from COVID-19 complications during the COVID-19 pandemic in Bangladesh in Dhaka on 28 June 2020.

References 

2020 deaths
People from Bogra District
Jatiya Party (Ershad) politicians
4th Jatiya Sangsad members
Deaths from the COVID-19 pandemic in Bangladesh
Place of birth missing
Date of birth missing